Florian Wellbrock (born 19 August 1997) is a German swimmer. He is the world record holder in the short course 1500 metre freestyle. He won gold medals in the 10 kilometre open water swim and 1500 metre freestyle at the 2019 World Aquatics Championships. At the 2020 Summer Olympics he won the gold medal in the 10 kilometre open water swim and the bronze medal in the 1500 metre freestyle. In December 2021, he won a gold medal in the 1500 metre freestyle at the 2021 World Short Course Championships.

Career

Early career
He competed in the men's 1500 metre freestyle event at the 2016 Summer Olympics. At the 2019 World Aquatics Championships, he became the first swimmer to win both the 1500m freestyle and the 10 km open-water race at an international competition. Wellbrock won the 10 kilometre open water swim in 1:47:55.90 with the silver and bronze medalists finishing within two seconds of his time.

2021

2020 Summer Olympics

Wellbrock qualified to represent Germany at the 2020 Summer Olympics, held in Tokyo, Japan and postponed to summer of 2021 due to the COVID-19 pandemic. His first medal of the Olympic Games was in the 1500 metre freestyle, where he won the bronze medal. Wellbrock also won a gold medal in the 10 kilometre open water swim a few days later with a time of 1:48:33.7, which was over 25 seconds faster than the second-place finisher. His gold medal was the first won in the event at an Olympic Games by a swimmer representing Germany. His Olympic medals in pool swimming and open water swimming marked the second time a swimmer won medals in both disciplines at one Olympic Games and he was closely followed by the third swimmer to do so, Gregorio Paltrinieri of Italy who also won a medal in each discipline at the 2020 Summer Olympics only Gregorio Paltrinieri won his second medal, a bronze medal in the 10 kilometre open water swim, seconds after Welllbrock and thus Wellbrock became the second swimmer in history to achieve the feat and Gregorio Paltrinieri the third.

2021 European Short Course Championships
At the 2021 European Short Course Swimming Championships, held at the Palace of Water Sports in Kazan, Russia, Wellbrock won a gold medal in the 1500 metre freestyle on 4 November with a time of 14:09.88. On 7 November, Wellbrock won the silver medal in the 800 metre freestyle in 7:27.99, finishing five-hundredths of a second behind gold medalist in the event Gregorio Paltrinieri.

2021 World Short Course Championships
At the Abu Dhabi Aquatics Festival, held in parallel with the 2021 World Short Course Championships, in December 2021, Wellbrock won a bronze medal as part of the open water 4×1500 metre mixed relay event. In his individual event, the 10 kilometre open water swim, Wellbrock won the gold medal in a time of 1:48:09.4, finishing over two seconds ahead of silver medalist Domenico Acerenza of Italy. As part of the World Championships, Wellbrock swam a 14:25.79 in the prelims heats of the 1500 metre freestyle on 20 December, qualifying for the final the following day ranking third. In the final of the 1500 metre freestyle, Wellbrock set a new world record with a time of 14:06.88 and won the gold medal. Wellbrock also co-hosted a swimming clinic at the venue of the World Championships, Etihad Arena, with Anthony Ervin of the United States.

Awards and honours
 FINA, Top 10 Moments: 2020 Summer Olympics (#9 for winning the first gold medal of his Olympic career in the 10 kilometre open water swim as a 23-year-old)
 FINA, Athlete of the Year, open water swimming (male): 2021
 Swimming World, Open Water Swimmer of the Year (male): 2019, 2021
 SwimSwam, Swammy Award, Open Water Swimmer of the Year (male): 2019, 2021
 SwimSwam, Top 100 (Men's): 2021 (#18), 2022 (#11)
 LEN, Best Open Water Swimmer (Male): 2021

Personal life
Wellbrock married Sarah Köhler of Germany in January 2022 after getting engaged in December 2020.

See also
 List of World Aquatics Championships medalists in swimming (men)
 List of World Swimming Championships (25 m) medalists (men)

References

External links
 

1997 births
Living people
German male swimmers
German male freestyle swimmers
Olympic swimmers of Germany
Swimmers at the 2016 Summer Olympics
Sportspeople from Bremen
European Aquatics Championships medalists in swimming
World Aquatics Championships medalists in open water swimming
World Aquatics Championships medalists in swimming
Swimmers at the 2020 Summer Olympics
Medalists at the 2020 Summer Olympics
Olympic bronze medalists in swimming
Olympic bronze medalists for Germany
World record setters in swimming
World record holders in swimming
Medalists at the FINA World Swimming Championships (25 m)